Nederpop or Dutch pop music is pop music made by  Dutch bands and artists.

The name is a play on the country's name in Dutch (Nederland). An English translation could be Netherpop. Nederpop is a Dutch term invented by the mid-1970s to describe the Dutch pop music scene of the 1960s and 1970s that was gaining worldwide attention, exemplified by bands such as Shocking Blue, Golden Earring and Focus. Most of the Nederpop bands of this period had English-language songs or played only instrumentals, but some of the bands performed exclusively in the Dutch language. Many such were popular thanks to airplay over the offshore pirate radio stations targeting the Netherlands such as Mi Amigo, Veronica, Atlantis and Northsea International.

During the early 1980s, the Nederpop term was revived to name the sudden growth of Dutch language pop music from the Netherlands. The revived meaning came about because of the huge success of Doe Maar. This success helped other bands to sing in Dutch and/or get the spotlight.

Sixties Nederpop bands
Golden Earring
The Motions
The Outsiders
Tee-Set
Cuby + Blizzards
Brainbox
The Cats
Sandy Coast
The Shoes
Peter Koelewijn
Boudewijn de Groot
Rob de Nijs

Seventies Nederpop bands
Shocking Blue
Mouth & MacNeal
Focus
Earth and Fire
George Baker
Golden Earring
Ekseption
Luv'
De Bintangs
Supersister
Pussycat
Teach-In
Livin' Blues
Kayak
Herman Brood
Gruppo Sportivo
Alquin
Normaal
BZN
Nits

Eighties Nederpop bands
Aside from Doe Maar, the early eighties were good for, amongst others, Golden Earring, Time Bandits (band), Diesel (band), Vandenberg, the Frank Boeijen Groep, Het Goede Doel, the Amazing Stroopwafels, Toontje Lager, VOF de Kunst, and Noodweer.

Female Nederpop bands of the time included the Dolly Dots and Mai Tai.

Later Nederpop
 Acda & de Munnik
 Luie hond
 Osdorp Posse
 De Dijk
 Van Dik Hout
 Bløf
 The Scene
 De Poema's (coöperation of Van Dik Hout and Acda & de Munnik)
 Spinvis
 Ellen ten Damme

Nederpop bands singing in regional languages
 Heidevolk, Dutch
 Normaal, Low German
 Rowwen Hèze, Limburgian
 Skik, Drèents dialects
 Twarres, West Frisian
 De Kast, West Frisian
 Mooi Wark, Drenthe

See also
 Dutch rock
 Nederbeat
 Europop

References

 
Dutch styles of music
Pop music by country